WOW 2000 is a compilation album of 30 contemporary Christian music hits and four bonus tracks that was released on October 26, 1999.  The album hit No. 29 on the Billboard 200 chart in 1999, and No. 1 on the Top Contemporary Christian chart in both 1999 and 2000. It was certified as double platinum in the US in 2000 by the Recording Industry Association of America (RIAA). The album was certified as gold in Canada in 2001 by the Canadian Recording Industry Association (CRIA).

Track listing

Purple disc
"Gravity" – Delirious?
"No One Loves Me Like You" – Jars of Clay (Note: Mistakenly titled "Nobody Loves Me Like You" on CD liner notes)
"Love Liberty Disco" – Newsboys
"Consume Me" – dc Talk
"I've Always Loved You" – Third Day
"Thankful" – Caedmon's Call
"A Little More" – Jennifer Knapp
"Get Down" – Audio Adrenaline
"I Want to Know You (In The Secret)" – Sonicflood
"River" – Out of Eden
"Basic Instructions" – Burlap To Cashmere
"Away From You" – The O.C. Supertones featuring Crystal Lewis
"Stranded" – Plumb
"The Rumor Weed Song" – The W's
"Always And Forever" – Raze
"New Way To Be Human" – Switchfoot
"Waiting Room" – LaRue

Silver disc
"Speechless" – Steven Curtis Chapman
"Takes a Little Time" – Amy Grant
"I Will Be Your Friend" – Michael W. Smith
"Show You Love" – Jaci Velasquez
"Can't Live A Day" – Avalon
"Breathe" – Sixpence None the Richer
"Saving Grace" – Point of Grace
"Run To You" – Twila Paris
"Revive Us" – Anointed
"It's Alright (Send Me)" – Winans Phase 2
"I Will Follow Christ" – Clay Crosse
"One of These Days" – FFH
"Omega" (Radio Remix) – Rebecca St. James
"For The Glory of Your Name" – Michelle Tumes
"Cartoons" – Chris Rice
"I Am" – Jill Phillips
"Friend of Mine (Columbine)" – Jonathan & Stephen Cohen

References

External links 
 WOW Hits online

1999 compilation albums
2000